Nathan Mensah (born 9 April 1998) is a Ghanaian college basketball player for the San Diego State Aztecs of the Mountain West Conference (MWC). 

Mensah is known for his immense wingspan of 7'4 ft. (224 cm).

He is of Christian faith.

High school career
Mensah grew up playing soccer in Ghana. At the age of 13, he began playing basketball after being recruited to play in a tournament. Mensah was spotted by Kwaku Amoaku and moved to the United States to attend Prolific Prep. In August 2017, he averaged 13.8 points and 7.4 rebounds per game for Team Africa in the Adidas Global Nations event. Mensah transferred to Findlay Prep before his senior season. Rated a four-star recruit, Mensah committed to playing college basketball for San Diego State in October 2017, choosing the Aztecs over Oregon, Oregon State, USC, and Texas Tech.

College career
As a freshman at San Diego State, Mensah averaged 5.6 points and 5.5 rebounds per game. On 28 December 2019, Mensah requested to be substituted during the second half of a game against Cal Poly, due to shortness of breath. He was diagnosed with a pulmonary embolism, forcing him to miss the remainder of the season. Mensah averaged 6.9 points and 6.8 rebounds per game as a sophomore. As a junior, he averaged 8.1 points and 6.1 rebounds per game. Mensah was named Mountain West Defensive Player of the Year as a senior as well as Honorable Mention All-Mountain West.

Career statistics

College

|-
| style="text-align:left;"| 2018–19
| style="text-align:left;"| San Diego State
| 34 || 20 || 18.9 || .541 || – || .708 || 5.5 || .6 || .3 || 1.1 || 5.6
|-
| style="text-align:left;"| 2019–20
| style="text-align:left;"| San Diego State
| 13 || 13 || 20.2 || .617 || – || .640 || 6.8 || .3 || .8 || 1.7 || 6.9
|-
| style="text-align:left;"| 2020–21
| style="text-align:left;"| San Diego State
| 28 || 27 || 21.4 || .579 || .000 || .600 || 6.1 || .6 || .6 || 1.4 || 8.1
|-
| style="text-align:left;"| 2021–22
| style="text-align:left;"| San Diego State
| 32 || 32 || 24.8 || .482 || .250 || .533 || 6.9 || .6 || .8 || 2.2 || 7.0
|- class="sortbottom"
| style="text-align:center;" colspan="2"| Career
| 107 || 92 || 21.5 || .539 || .143 || .612 || 6.2 || .6 || .6 || 1.6 || 6.8

References

External links
San Diego State Aztecs bio

1998 births
Living people
Centers (basketball)
Ghanaian Christians
Ghanaian expatriate sportspeople in the United States
Ghanaian men's basketball players
Power forwards (basketball)
San Diego State Aztecs men's basketball players
Sportspeople from Accra